The UAAP Season 85 volleyball tournaments are the University Athletic Association of the Philippines (UAAP) volleyball tournaments for the 2022–23 school year. The first completed tournament since 2019.

The collegiate men's and women's tournaments began on February 25, 2023.

The high school boys' and girls' tournaments began earlier on February 13, 2023.

This is the first tournament for men's, boys' and girls' since the COVID-19 pandemic.

Tournament format 
The UAAP continued to use the UAAP Final Four format.

The league reverted its pre-pandemic Wednesday, Saturday and Sunday schedule and protocols such as handshakes and court-side switches between the two teams.

It will also reintroduce the use of video challenge system beginning second round of the tournaments. This will give each team two challenges per set to review questionable calls by the officials.

Mike Verano appointed as the UAAP Volleyball commissioner for this season.

Teams 
All eight member universities of the UAAP fielded teams in two divisions.

Name changes 
 Ateneo Lady Eagles and Ateneo Blue Eaglets: On May 5, 2022, Ateneo announced that all of its UAAP teams, regardless of gender, sport or division will now be called the "Blue Eagles".

Coaching changes

Venues 

The UAAP released its schedule on February 9. Opening weekend is at SM Mall of Asia Arena in Pasay, with games at PhilSports Arena in Pasig, Araneta Coliseum in Quezon City, and Filoil EcoOil Centre in San Juan.

For Wednesday quadrupleheaders, the men's tournament played at the PhilSports Arena in Pasig; on all other game days, the men's teams played on the same venue and day as their corresponding women's team. For high school teams, the tournaments played at Paco Arena in Manila.

Squads 
Each team has a 20-player roster, of which four are reserves. Only one foreign student athlete (FSA) or import is allowed to be on the active roster.

Imports

Men's tournament

Team line-up

Elimination round

Team standings

Match-up results

Game results 
Results on top and to the right of the solid cells are for first-round games; those to the bottom and to the left of it are second-round games.

Bracket

Semifinals 
The top two seeds in the semifinals have the twice-to-beat advantage.
 
If a team wins all elimination round games, the stepladder format will be used where two lowest seeded teams will play off to determine the opponent of the #2 seed, which still has the twice-to-beat advantage.

Finals 
The finals is a best-of-three playoff.

Women's tournament

Team line-up

Elimination round

Team standings

Match-up results

Game results 
Results on top and to the right of the solid cells are for first-round games; those to the bottom and to the left of it are second-round games.

Bracket

Semifinals 
The top two seeds in the semifinals have the twice-to-beat advantage.
 
If a team wins all elimination round games, the stepladder format will be used where two lowest seeded teams will play off to determine the opponent of the #2 seed, which still has the twice-to-beat advantage.

Finals 
The finals is a best-of-three playoff.

Awards

Players of the Week

Boys' tournament

Team line-up

Elimination round

Team standings

Match-up results

Game results 
Results on top and to the right of the solid cells are for first-round games; those to the bottom and to the left of it are second-round games.

Bracket

Semifinals 
NSNU and FEU-D have the twice-to-beat advantage.

NSNU vs. UST

FEU-D vs. UE

Finals 
The finals is a best-of-three playoff.

Awards 

The awards were handed out prior to Game 2 of the Finals at the Paco Arena.
 Most Valuable Player: 
 Rookie of the Year: 
 Best Outside Spikers:
 
 
 Best Middle Blockers:
 
 
 Best Opposite Spiker: 
 Best Setter: 
 Best Libero:

Girls' tournament

Team line-up

Elimination round

Team standings

Match-up results

Game results 
Results on top and to the right of the solid cells are for first-round games; those to the bottom and to the left of it are second-round games.

Bracket

Finals 
The finals is a best-of-three playoff.

 Finals Most Valuable Player:

Awards 

The awards were handed out prior to Game 2 of the Finals at the Paco Arena.
 Most Valuable Player: 
 Rookie of the Year: 
 Best Outside Spikers:
 
 
 Best Middle Blockers:
 
 
 Best Opposite Spiker: 
 Best Setter: 
 Best Libero:

See also 
 NCAA Season 98 volleyball tournaments

References 

UAAP volleyball tournaments
Current volleyball seasons
2023 in Philippine sport
February 2023 sports events in the Philippines
March 2023 sports events in the Philippines